Avafi may refer to:
 Avafi, Ahvaz